Afonso Gamelas de Pinho Sousa (born 3 May 2000) is a Portuguese professional footballer who plays for Ekstraklasa club Lech Poznań as a central midfielder.

Club career

Porto
Born in Aveiro, Sousa returned to FC Porto's youth academy at the age of 13, after a first spell in 2009. He made his senior debut with the reserve team in the LigaPro on 25 August 2019, playing the entire 3–1 away win against S.C. Farense and scoring in the match.

Sousa was part of the squad that won the 2018–19 UEFA Youth League, notably netting in the 3–1 victory over Chelsea in the final.

Belenenses SAD
On 9 September 2020, Sousa signed a four-year contract with Primeira Liga club Belenenses SAD, with Porto retaining 50% of the player's rights. He played his first game in the competition nine days later, coming on as a 67th-minute substitute for Silvestre Varela in the 1–0 away defeat of Vitória de Guimarães. He scored his first goal on 20 December, just before half-time in a 2–1 home win over S.C. Braga.

Lech Poznań
On 30 June 2022, Sousa moved to defending Polish Ekstraklasa champions Lech Poznań on a four-year deal, for a fee reported around €1,200,000. He made his competitive debut on 9 July, coming on as a substitute in a 2–0 Polish Super Cup loss to Raków Częstochowa.

International career
Sousa earned 42 caps for Portugal across all youth levels, starting with the under-15 team in 2015. His first appearance for the under-21s came on 7 October 2021 in an 11–0 home rout of Liechtenstein in 2023 UEFA European Championship qualification. He scored his first goal the following 24 September, closing the 4–1 friendly win over Georgia.

Personal life
Both Sousa's father, Ricardo, and grandfather António, played as midfielders and later worked as managers.

Career statistics

Honours
Porto
UEFA Youth League: 2018–19

References

External links

2000 births
Living people
People from Aveiro, Portugal
Sportspeople from Aveiro District
Portuguese footballers
Association football midfielders
Primeira Liga players
Liga Portugal 2 players
G.D. Gafanha players
FC Porto B players
Belenenses SAD players
Ekstraklasa players
II liga players
Lech Poznań players
Lech Poznań II players
Portugal youth international footballers
Portugal under-21 international footballers
Portuguese expatriate footballers
Expatriate footballers in Poland
Portuguese expatriate sportspeople in Poland